German Unity Day is the National Day of Germany, celebrated on 3 October as a public holiday. It commemorates German reunification in 1990 when the German Democratic Republic (East Germany) joined the Federal Republic of Germany (West Germany), so that for the first time since 1945 there existed a single German state. German Unity Day on 3 October has been the German National Holiday since 1990, when the reunification was formally completed.

An alternative choice to commemorate the reunification could have been the day the Berlin Wall came down: 9 November 1989, which coincided with the anniversary of the proclamation of the German Republic in 1918, and the defeat of Hitler's first coup in 1923. However, 9 November was also the anniversary of the first large-scale Nazi-led pogroms against Jews in 1938 (Kristallnacht), so the day was considered inappropriate as a national holiday (see 9 November in German history). Therefore, 3 October 1990, the day of the formal reunification, was chosen instead. It replaced the "German Unity Day" on 17 June, the national holiday of the Federal Republic of Germany from 1954.

History
Germany has historically associated various dates with its nationhood and unity.

Imperial Germany
Before 1871, in the area where the single state of Germany now exists, different kingdoms and principalities existed. After the unification of Germany, and the Founding of the Empire 1871, there was still no common national holiday. The Sedantag was, however, celebrated every year on 2 September, recalling the decisive victory in the Franco-Prussian War on 2 September 1870.

Before the Empire was founded in 1872, there were calls for a national holiday, and there were three suggestions. No decision was made. Until 1873, the Sedantag was moved to 18 January or the day of the Frankfurt Treaty (10 May 1871). The Sedantag would soon also be celebrated at the universities and in many German cities. It never occurred to them to think about "Empire Parade" or "Emperor's Birthday". Some Culture Ministers of the states, especially in Prussia, decided that the Sedantag would be an official festival in schools. Upon many suggestions, the date of the Emperor's proclamation on 18 January would be established as day of remembrance. Emperor Wilhelm I declined this: "This was also the day of the first Prussian coronation of the king, which should not fall into the shadow of a united German holiday."

Weimar Republic
On 31 July 1919, the Weimar Constitution would be accepted in its form by the Weimar National Congress. In memorial of this "Hour of birth of democracy", 11 August was created as Constitution Day, because the President of Germany Friedrich Ebert, signed the constitution on this day.

National Socialism
Shortly after the Nazis took power in 1933 (the so-called Machtergreifung), May Day (1 May) was established as a national holiday in the German Reich. It was already celebrated as a "Day of the Labor Movement" since 1890, and also was part of the tradition for the May dance commemorating the Walpurgis Night. Immediately after the establishment of the holiday in 1933, the Nazis banned trade unions on 2 May 1933 and occupied their buildings as offices for the Nazi Movement. On 1 March 1939, Hitler declared 9 November (the day of the failed Beer Hall Putsch in 1923) as the "Memorial Day for the movement" as the national holiday.

Federal Republic of Germany
From 1954 to 1990, 17 June was an official holiday in the Federal Republic of Germany to commemorate the East German uprising of 1953, even with the name "Day of the German Unity". Since 1963, it was proclaimed by the President of the Federal Republic as "National Day of Memorial of the German People". However, by the mid-1960s as hope faded that the two Germanies would ever be re-united, this date became more of a holiday and day of recreation than a day to consider national unity.
In the year 1990, the "Day of German Unity" was celebrated twice, on this date and on 3 October.

German Democratic Republic
In East Germany, the Founding Day in 1949 was celebrated on 7 October as Day of the Republic, until the 40th anniversary in 1989.

Decision for GDR's unity with the Federal Republic
The motive for setting the date of 3 October as the possible Day of Unity was decided by the Volkskammer (GDR Congress) on the impending economical and political collapse of the GDR. The Helsinki Conference was set for 2 October, at which the foreign ministers would be informed of the results of the Two-plus-Four talks.

At the beginning of July, the governments of both German states decided on the schedule: elections in the GDR would be held on 14 October, and a common election for the entire country on 2 December.

The decision on the date was finally made on 22 August by the GDR's Minister-President, Lothar de Maizière, at a special session of the Volkskammer, which began at 9 p.m. After a heated debate, the President of the Volkskammer, Sabine Bergmann-Pohl, announced the results at 2:30 a.m. on 23 August:

Gregor Gysi, Chairman of the SED-PDS, was visibly moved and made a personal statement: "Madame President! The Parliament has no more and no less decided on the downfall of the German Democratic Republic as of 3 October 1990". (Jubilant cheers from the CDU/DA, DSU and SPD.)

Attempt to change the date of national holiday
On 3 November 2004, the Federal Chancellor, Gerhard Schröder, suggested that the "Day of the German Unity" be celebrated on a Sunday, for economic reasons. Instead of 3 October, the National Reunification should be celebrated on the first Sunday of October. This suggestion received a lot of criticism from many sides, amongst them from Federal President Horst Köhler as well as the President of the Bundestag, Wolfgang Thierse. The demand worried a part of the population because of discontent for increased working hours would be seen as a provocation and devaluing the national holiday. In addition, fixing the Unity Day on the first Sunday of October would have meant that it would sometimes fall on 7 October, which happens to have been the national day of East Germany; this date would thus have been seen as commemorating the division of Germany rather than the reunification. The idea was dropped after a short but angry debate.

Celebrations

The Day of German Unity is celebrated each year with a ceremonial act and a citizens' festival.

The celebrations are hosted by a major city, usually the state capital, in the German state presiding over the Bundesrat in the respective year (a sequence determined by the Königstein Agreement). After Bonn in 2011, Frankfurt am Main was the second non-state capital to host the celebrations in 2015; however, both cities are significant in German political history (Bonn as former capital of West Germany and Frankfurt as the place of the Frankfurt Parliament of 1848–49).

In addition, various celebrations are held in the federal capital Berlin, mainly based on the Straße des 17. Juni and around the Brandenburg Gate. State capitals and also other cities often have additional festivities. Furthermore, the Oktoberfest beer festival in Munich, which traditionally runs until the first Sunday in October, now runs until 3 October, if the Sunday in question falls on the first or second day of October. The celebrations in the host city always includes a festival and fireworks show.

Zipfelbund: compass communities
The Zipfelbund are the four communities at the cardinal compass points of Germany: North – List on the island of Sylt, West – Selfkant, South – Oberstdorf and East – Görlitz. Together, they always participate in the respective annual celebration to represent the modern borders of Germany.

See also
 East German uprising of 1953

References

External links

 Tag der Deutschen Einheit 2014 Niedersächsische Staatskanzlei
 Tag der Deutschen Einheit 2011 Bonn 
 Chronik der Mauer chronik-der-mauer.de 1990 
 Video: Volkskammerbeschluss 23. August 1990 zum Beitritt der DDR zur Bundesrepublik Deutsches Rundfunkarchiv 1989 
 German Embassy Publication, Infocus:German Unity Day

National days
Unity Day
Germany
October observances
German reunification
Autumn events in Germany
German flag flying days